Gunton is a surname. Notable people with the surname include:

Bob Gunton (born 1945), American actor
Colin Gunton (1941–2003), British theologian
Frederick Gunton (1813–1888), English organist
George Gunton (1845–1919), American economist
Mike Gunton, British television producer
Rebecca Joanne Gunton (born 1976), birth name of English news presenter Becky Jago
Samuel Gunton (1883–1959), English association football player
Simon Gunton (1609–1676), English divine and antiquary

English-language surnames
English toponymic surnames